Novena is a planning area located within the Central Region of Singapore. Novena is bounded by Toa Payoh to the north, Bukit Timah to the west, Tanglin to the south and Kallang to the east. While Novena is not classified as a "new town" by the Housing and Development Board (HDB), the estate of Whampoa within the subzone of Balestier constitutes part of the Kallang/Whampoa New Town.

Tan Tock Seng Hospital, set up by philanthropist Tan Tock Seng in 1844, one of the oldest and busiest hospitals in Singapore, is located in this area.

Etymology 

Novena and its associated roads, buildings and Mass Rapid Transit station are named after Novena Church (canonically the Church of Saint Alphonsus Liguori) located in the area.

Balestier Road was named after Joseph Balestier, an American diplomat who served in Singapore in the 1800s.

Housing
Land in Novena is very expensive because of its close proximity to the Central Area. There are few HDB flats in Novena; most houses in the area are condominiums or private housing.

Education
, this area has a total of three primary schools, three secondary schools and Catholic Junior College. The offshore campus of Curtin University is located at Balestier.

Transportation
Novena is accessible by MRT, with buses serving the city, nearest neighbouring estates and is close proximity to the expressway. The area has no bus interchange, the nearest being in Toa Payoh. However, Saint Michael's Bus Terminal can be found along Balestier.

Commercial services

Central to this area is Novena Square, a mixed used development situated directly above the Novena MRT station. Novena Medical Centre is located at levels 8 to 11 of the Square 2 shopping centre. Adjacent to Novena Square's Office Tower is a sports-themed mall called Novena Velocity. Opposite Novena Square, and across the Junction of Newton Road, Moulmein Road and Thomson Road, is United Square Shopping Mall, a children-oriented mall, with shops catering to infants, kids and parents. Shops located in the Novena area include Starbucks (one in United Square and another in Novena Square), Cold Storage, Decathlon and the newly opened Don Don Donki at Square 2, a Japanese Discount Store. Banks located in the Novena area include POSB and UOB. Novena has seen major improvements in terms of new shops opening in the area since Square 2 and Velocity commenced business in recent years.

A new Integrated Care Hub will be completed by 2022 as part of HealthCity Novena, which will include a hospital, medical school and step-down facilities, as well as the National Centre for Infectious Diseases.

Novena Square
Velocity@Novena Square, formerly known as Novena Square, is a sports and lifestyle mall with a new building extension. It lies directly above Novena MRT station. It was opened in December 2000, and owned by Novena Square Investments. There are 160 stores and spans 3 floors.

Square 2
Square 2 is located at the Novena MRT station. It was opened on 10 December 2007, and it is developed and owned by Far East Organization. It has over 180 specialty stores, selling food and beverage, fashion and accessories, education and enrichment, as well as beauty & wellness services, spanning five floors.

See also
Balestier Road
Farrer Park
Whampoa

References

External links
 

 
Central Region, Singapore
Places in Singapore